Sumathi Srinivas is best known as a Social Entrepreneur and an inspirational Speaker. She is the CEO & Founder of The Twilite Group, a media house with multiple divisions. She is the managing Trustee of an NGO called Soulmates Foundation, Founder of Twilite Creations event management company, Producer of Mrs. Home Maker – a reality show for women, Founder of a business networking forum called EWC – Elite Women Club,  and the publisher, editor-in-chief of WE Magazine and Club Elite Magazine.

Social involvement 
Sumathi Srinivas is the Managing Trustee of the NGO Soulmates Foundation founded in 2013. The NGO works towards the "upliftment of the women and for the education of underprivileged children". Sumathi Srinivas, is a woman with deep commitment to charity & social service, work of serving humanity. She loved teaching and enjoyed shaping young minds. Her main quote in Soulmates Foundation is ”Lend Your Souls” as she believed: "Not all of us can do great things. But we can do small things with great love".

We Magazine 
Women Exclusive Magazine is 15-year-old Indian magazine that has evolved to cover various topics including fashion, cinema, relationships, and achievers who have left a mark in the society.

Its marquee property includes the WE Awards''.

Awards 

 Best Women Entrepreneur Award from Tamil Nadu Government
 Sadhanai Pengal Award
 Mother Teresa Excellence Award
 Women Achiever 2014 by Rotary International District 3230
 Tagore Engineering Women Achiever Award
 Raindrops Sadhanai Pengal
 Pennalam Award
 Mahila Jyothi Award
 Tamil Business Women of the year(UK)
 Penn Vetrikku Pin
 Naturals Extraordinary Woman Award
 Best Woman Entrepreneur Award by Women Entrepreneur's Welfare Association

References 

Year of birth missing (living people)
Living people
Indian social entrepreneurs
Indian women chief executives
Indian publishers (people)
Businesswomen from Tamil Nadu
21st-century Indian businesswomen
21st-century Indian businesspeople